Gregory John Brough (26 March 1951 – 9 March 2014) was an Australian long-distance freestyle swimmer of the 1960s and 1970s, who won a bronze medal in the 1500-metre freestyle at the 1968 Summer Olympics.  In Mexico City, Brough finished behind the American world record-holder Mike Burton and his teammate John Kinsella.  He also finished fourth in the 400-metre, also won by Burton.  At the 1970 Commonwealth Games in Edinburgh, Brough won a bronze in the 400-metre behind fellow Australian Graham White.

He attended The Southport School.

See also
 List of Commonwealth Games medallists in swimming (men)
 List of Olympic medalists in swimming (men)

References

External links 
Greg Brough's obituary
Colourful Gold Coast Olympic swimmer Gregh Brough laid to rest

1951 births
2014 deaths
Olympic bronze medalists for Australia
Olympic bronze medalists in swimming
Olympic swimmers of Australia
Australian male freestyle swimmers
Swimmers at the 1968 Summer Olympics
Sportspeople from the Gold Coast, Queensland
Medalists at the 1968 Summer Olympics
Commonwealth Games medallists in swimming
Commonwealth Games bronze medallists for Australia
Swimmers at the 1970 British Commonwealth Games
Medallists at the 1970 British Commonwealth Games